Robert Edward Rogers (February 19, 1940 – March 3, 2013) was an American musician and tenor singer, best known as a member of Motown vocal group the Miracles from 1956 until his death. He was inducted, in 2012, as a member of the Miracles to the Rock and Roll Hall of Fame. In addition to singing, he also contributed to writing some of the Miracles' songs. Rogers is the grandfather of R&B singer Brandi Williams from the R&B girl group Blaque and is a cousin of fellow Miracles member Claudette Rogers Robinson.

Life 
Rogers was the son of Robert and Lois Rogers. He was born in Detroit on February 19, 1940, the same day and in the same Detroit hospital as fellow Miracles member Smokey Robinson, although the two would not meet until 15 years later.

On December 18, 1963, Rogers married Wanda Young of Inkster, Michigan, a member of Motown group the Marvelettes. Together they had a son Robert Rogers III and a daughter Bobbae. Rogers and Young divorced in 1975 after twelve years of marriage. In 1981, Rogers married Joan Hughes on his forty-first birthday. The wedding ceremony was officiated by the Reverend Cecil Franklin, the older brother of Queen of Soul Aretha Franklin at Detroit's historic New Bethel Baptist Church. Bobby and Joan had two children together, daughters Gina and Kimberly. In his final years, Rogers divided his residence between his primary dwelling in Southfield, Michigan, a northern suburb of Detroit,  and a Beverly Hills, California pied-à-terre.

Motown, The Miracles, and musical career 

The 1960 single "Shop Around", with Smokey Robinson on lead, was Motown's first number one hit on the R&B singles chart, and the first big hit for the Miracles. The song was also Motown's first million selling hit single. The Miracles scored many more hits over the years including the #1 classics "Tears Of A Clown", and "Love Machine".

In addition to his work in the Miracles, Rogers was a part-time Motown songwriter; his most notable composition, authored with bandmate Smokey Robinson, was The Temptations' first hit single, "The Way You Do the Things You Do". Rogers also co-wrote The Temptations' 1965 hit "My Baby", Mary Wells' hit, "What Love Has Joined Together", The Contours' 1965 hit "First I Look at the Purse", (later covered by the J. Geils Band), Marvin Gaye's 1966 Top 40 hit, "One More Heartache" and the Miracles' own 1964 Top 40 hit, "That's What Love Is Made Of", and their 1966 hit, "Going to a Go-Go". He is also noted for doing co-lead vocals on the Miracles' 1962 Top 10 smash, "You've Really Got a Hold on Me", and singing lead on the group's 1964 song, "You're So Fine And Sweet". Bobby was also reputed to be the group's best dancer, and was responsible for many of the Miracles' onstage routines, until the arrival of famed Motown choreographer Cholly Atkins.

In late 2006, Bobby re-united with original Miracles members Smokey Robinson and Pete Moore for the group's first-ever extended interview on the Motown DVD release, Smokey Robinson & the Miracles: The Definitive Performances.

Rogers continued to perform throughout the United States, Canada, and Europe with members Dave Finley, Tee Turner, and Mark Scott in the final incarnation of The Miracles, which made him, as of 2009, the longest-serving original Miracles member. On March 20, 2009, Bobby was in Hollywood to be honored along with the other surviving original members of the Miracles (Smokey Robinson, Claudette Robinson and Pete Moore) as they received a star on the Hollywood Walk of Fame. Also on hand were Gloria White, the wife of original Miracles member Ronnie White who is deceased (White is responsible for discovering Motown artist Stevie Wonder), and Billy Griffin was in attendance. He replaced Smokey Robinson when he left the group.

Death 
Rogers died on March 3, 2013, at the age of 73, due to complications of diabetes. Nine days later, on March 12, 2013, on their website, The Rock and Roll Hall of Fame paid tribute to Bobby with the article, "Remembering Bobby Rogers of The Miracles".

The Miracles: Awards and professional recognition 
 Bobby, and each member of the Miracles (except Claudette) has been awarded the BMI award for songwriting .(Reference: Ebony, October 1971, pg 169).
 Berry Gordy's Motown Record Corporation's signature act; their first Group, and their first million selling act was the Miracles, Motown Royalty.
 Without the Miracles there would be no Motown, quoted Berry Gordy, March 20, 2009
 Without the Miracles there would be no Stevie Wonder, quoted Stevie Wonder, March 20, 2009
 Gold and Platinum Record (Single and Album) Awards (Sales of more than 500,000 or 1,000,000 units)
 Worldwide over 40 Million records sold.
 Twenty-six of the Miracles single releases reached the Top Ten Billboard R&B Charts
 Four of the Miracles songs reached #1 on Billboard R&B Charts
 Ten Miracles albums reached the Top Ten of Billboard's R&B Album Charts.
 Sixteen releases of the Miracles recordings reached the top 20 of Billboards Hot 100 List with 7 Top Tens and 2-# 1's a third song, Shop Around reached #1 Pop on Cash Box Magazine "Top 100" Pop chart.
 Four time inductees Grammy Hall of Fame. (the most of any Motown Group).
 Doo-Wop Hall of Fame Inductees.
 Quadruple induction Rock and Roll Hall of Fame's "Songs That Shaped Rock and Roll" song List.
 Double recipient of the prestigious "Heroes and Legends" Award.
 Rhythm & Blues Pioneer Award
 Vocal Group Hall of Fame Induction and Award
 Spirit of Detroit Award
 Rolling Stone Magazine named The Miracles the "32nd Greatest Rock n' Roll Artists" of all time.
 Billboard Magazine and VH1 list the Miracles of the 100 Greatest Artists of all Time.
 Under the terms of the National Recording Preservation Act of 2000, the Library's National Recording Preservation Board announced the Miracles' million seller, "Tracks of My Tears" being "culturally, historically, and aesthetically significant" to preserve for all time in the United States Library of Congress.
 Miracles Boulevard and Miracles Park, Detroit, Michigan (Woodbridge Estates)
 Governor of the state of Michigan, Certificate of Tribute and recognition of the Miracles and their importance to the state of Michigan and the city of Detroit for tremendous accomplishments in the music industry.
 Mayor of Detroit Proclamation for a Lifetime of history making accomplishments in music.
 Resolution Award, the Detroit City Council gave the Highest Honor they can present to the Miracles for 5 decades of unchallenged achievements in the music industry.
 City of Beverly Hills, CA, Beverly Hills Mayor and City Council Proclamation recognizing the Miracles' contributions to the music industry and American Culture.
 The Miracles received a star on the Hollywood Walk of Fame on March 20, 2009.
 The Miracles were retroactively inducted into the Rock and Roll Hall of Fame in 2012 by a special committee, alongside Smokey Robinson.

Rock and Roll Hall of Fame Induction in 2012 
In 1987, Smokey Robinson was inducted into the Rock and Roll Hall of Fame as a solo artist.  However, in a decision that has since sparked much scrutiny, debate, and controversy, the other original members of the Miracles, Bobby Rogers, Ronnie White, Marv Tarplin, Pete Moore and Claudette Robinson, were not, at that time, inducted.  This proved a source of many protests from angry Miracles fans.

On February 9, 2012, it was announced that Bobby Rogers would be inducted with the rest of the Miracles into the Rock and Roll Hall of Fame alongside Miracles lead singer Smokey Robinson. This induction occurred on April 14, 2012.  After a 26-year wait, Bobby was automatically and retroactively inducted with the rest of the original Miracles, Marv Tarplin, Pete Moore, Claudette Robinson, and Ronnie White into The Rock and Roll Hall of Fame alongside Miracles lead singer Smokey Robinson.  The induction was handled by a Special Committee designated by The Rock Hall in 2012, that inducted the Miracles, and five other deserving pioneering groups, that were overlooked when their lead singers were inducted into the Rock Hall many years ago. This induction occurred without the usual process of nomination and voting, under the premise that the entire group should have been inducted with Smokey Robinson back in 1987.
Bobby was also inducted with the rest of the original Miracles into the Rhythm and Blues Music Hall of Fame in 2015

References

External links 
 The Miracles' ''Rock and Roll Hall of Fame Induction page.
 The Miracles Bobby Rogers
 
Obituary of Bobby Rogers of The Miracles

1940 births
2013 deaths
Musicians from Detroit
The Miracles members
Motown artists
American soul musicians
American rhythm and blues singer-songwriters
Deaths from diabetes
American tenors
American rhythm and blues singers
American soul singers
American male dancers
African-American male singer-songwriters
20th-century African-American male singers
Singer-songwriters from Michigan